Wine cask may refer to:
 a wine barrel
 a Bag-In-Box storage for wine, used for box wine (especially in Australian English).